The 2017–18 Magyar Kupa (English: Hungarian Cup) was the 78th season of Hungary's annual knock-out cup football competition. Újpest FC won the cup beating Puskás Akadémia FC in the final at the Groupama Aréna.

The title-holders, Ferencváros were eliminated in the second round by Kisvárda FC. The tournament was won by Újpest.

Main Tournament
On 6 September 2017, it was announced that the Hungarian Football Federation will distribute 300 million HUF in the 2017–18 Magyar Kupa season.

On 11 September the draw took place at the headquarters of the Hungarian Football Federation. This was the first draw in the 2017–18 season where Nemzeti Bajnokság I and Nemzeti Bajnokság II clubs were included. 

On 14 September 2017, the date of the match between Veszprém and Diósgyőr was modified.

Round of 128

Round of 64
On 22 September 2017 the draw of the second proper took place. The 2016–17 Magyar Kupa winner Ferencváros will play against the leader of the 2017–18 Nemzeti Bajnokság II, Kisvárda FC.

Round of 32
On 25 October 2017, the draw of the third round proper took place at the headquarters of the Hungarian Football Federation.

Round of 16
On 29 November 2017, the draw of the third round proper took place at the headquarters of the Hungarian Football Federation.

First leg

Second leg

Quarter-finals
On 28 February 2018, the draw of the fifth round proper took place.

First leg

Second leg

Semi-finals
On 3 April 2018, Debrecen reached the last four. On 4 April 2018, Újpest, Balmazújváros and Puskás Akadémia qualified for the semi finals. On 5 April 2018, it was published by Nemzeti Sport that MTK Budapest is considering to caveat the second-leg of the quarter-finals against Újpest because according to the regulations only 5 non-EU player can play in the Magyar Kupa matches. However, there were 6 non-EU players in the Újpest FC team.

On 6 April 2018, the draw took place at the headquarters of the Hungarian Football Federation.

First leg

Second leg

Final

Statistics

Top goalscorers

Updated to games played on 11 May 2018

See also
 2017–18 Nemzeti Bajnokság I
 2017–18 Nemzeti Bajnokság II
 2017–18 Nemzeti Bajnokság III

References

External links
 Official site 

 soccerway.com

Cup
Hungary
Magyar Kupa seasons